Peter Hughes is an American multi-instrumentalist currently with the band The Mountain Goats. During live performances, he accompanies leader John Darnielle on bass. His first official recording with the band was 2002's Tallahassee, and he has performed on every subsequent studio album up to 2022’s Bleed Out, but he also sang backup vocals on the song "Cubs in Five" from the 1995 EP Nine Black Poppies. That year, The Mountain Goats also dedicated an EP to him, Songs for Peter Hughes.

Hughes is also a member of DiskothiQ and was the bassist for Nothing Painted Blue.

In 2001, Hughes published The Baseball Diaries, his account of 31 ballgames that he attended in 2000.

In 2004, Hughes released a solo album titled The One Hundred Thousand Songs of Peter Peter Hughes.

In 2010, he released a solo album titled Fangio.

Personal life 
Hughes's father was a flight-test technician for McDonnell Douglas, prompting a lasting interest in aviation.

Hughes currently resides in Rochester, NY.

References

External links 
 Peter Hughes interview on The Merlin Show
 Fivetools.com Peter Hughes' official website.

American bass guitarists
Living people
Year of birth missing (living people)
The Mountain Goats members
Musicians from Rochester, New York